Karakatsanis is a Greek surname. Notable people with the surname include:

 Karakatsanis (athlete), Greek shooter in the 1896 Olympics
 Andromache Karakatsanis (born 1955), justice on the Supreme Court of Canada
 Konstantinos Karakatsanis (born 1877), Greek runner in the 1896 Olympics
 Thymios Karakatsanis (1940-2012), Greek actor

Greek-language surnames
Surnames